Would Be Kings is a Canadian television mini-series directed by David Wellington, which aired on CTV on January 27 and January 28, 2008.

Plot 

Based loosely on Shakespeare's play King Henry IV (part 1), Patrick Lehane (Currie Graham) and Jamie Collins (Ben Bass) are cops. They are also cousins and Patrick is Jamie's boss. Patrick is the "by-the-books" cop while Jamie is the always-breaking-the-rules type of cop who is also dealing with a drug addiction. As their relationship comes to a crossroads, Jamie is forced to clean up his act and Patrick gets involved in questionable police work which leads to dirty money and murder. He also has a wife (Natasha Henstridge) and daughter (Clare Stone) to protect.

Production
The miniseries was filmed in Hamilton, Ontario, in 2006.

Awards

References

External links 
 

2008 films
2008 Canadian television series debuts
CTV Television Network original programming
Television shows based on plays
Films directed by David Wellington
2000s Canadian television miniseries
2008 Canadian television series endings
2000s Canadian crime drama television series
English-language Canadian films